Margareta Ann-Christine Bärnsten (born 10 July 1957), is a Swedish singer and writer, who has written several detective stories.

As a student Bärnsten  attended the Adolf Fredrik's Music School, a high profile song-and-chorus school in Stockholm. As a singer, she has participated at Melodifestivalen 1975 with the song Ska vi plocka körsbär i min trädgård, which ended up 9th.

Svensktoppen hit songs
"Ska vi plocka körsbär i min trädgård" – 1975

Bibliography
Döden är en schlager - 2005
Gröna villan - 2007

References

1957 births
Living people
Swedish women singers
Swedish crime fiction writers